The American College of Monaco was a tertiary institution located in Monte Carlo, Monaco, that operated from 1968 until 1970. The college offered a four-year degree program and was reportedly established by the Principality at the request of Princess Grace.

The college held classes in the Hotel Hermitage behind the Hotel de Paris, and the famous Monte Carlo Casino during its first academic year. After that, the school relocated to the Hotel Splendid, on the border of Beausoleil. Prince Rainier III was the Chancellor of the School, and the famous oceanographer, Jacques Yves Cousteau, was a member of its Board of Academic Overseers.

Notable alumni 
David Lance Cornwell (1969) - a United States congressman who represented Indiana

References 

Universities and colleges in Monaco
Educational institutions established in 1968
Educational institutions disestablished in 1970